In February 2020, the office of the Mississippi State Auditor arrested six people it accused of mishandling federal funds disbursed by the Mississippi Department of Human Services, including the department's former director. In May, the auditor's office released a report identifying $94 million in questionable spending by the department, much of it being funneled through two nonprofits, the Mississippi Community Education Center and Family Resource Center of North Mississippi. The auditing investigations have found that the money was made available to several high profile figures for various purposes, including professional football star Brett Favre and wrestler Brett DiBiase. The reveal of the state investigation also triggered a federal investigation.

Background 
By the late 2010s, the Mississippi Department of Human Services annually received approximately $86.5 million from the United States federal government in a Temporary Assistance for Needy Families (TANF) block grant. The federal government required the state of Mississippi to match what it spent of the grant with its own funds and stipulated that the state needed to document impoverished families who received direct cash assistance. It did not have strict reporting standards for how the state chose to use the grant otherwise. State audits regularly criticized the Department of Human Services for lax monitoring controls for federal grant spending.

Misspending

Department funding of nonprofits 
On January 11, 2016, Mississippi Governor Phil Bryant appointed John Davis as the director of the Mississippi Department of Human Services. At the time, the agency was providing a record low number of recipients with direct cash assistance welfare in favor of other programs, such as job training classes. The department did not record who the classes served, and in many instances did not set income level eligibility requirements for class attendees. Davis halted the department's competitive bidding process for acquiring contractors and over four years ordered the agency to grant the nonprofit organizations Mississippi Community Education Center and Family Resource Center of North Mississippi $65 million and $45 million, respectively, to fund the Families First of Mississippi program. The nonprofits received the money upfront and not as reimbursements for tasks performed, as was most common for other nonprofits who worked with the department as TANF subgrantees.

Brett Favre and Mississippi state officials
In 2020, Brett Favre's involvement with the development and promotion of a concussion treatment drug, Prevasol, by the Prevacus corporation, came under scrutiny. The nonprofit Mississippi Community Education Center (MCEC) received $2.5 million in federal grant funds diverted from Mississippi's TANF welfare funds, as well as tens of millions in public funds as an element of the scheme. The Mississippi state auditor has termed the scheme "the largest public embezzlement case in state history". A grand jury in Hinds County indicted MCEC founder, Nancy New, and her son Zach in the scheme. Favre had introduced MCEC's founders to top state welfare officials. A lawsuit filed against former Mississippi Governor Phil Bryant for his alleged role in the scandal resulted in the publication of a 2017 text message between Nancy New, operator of the nonprofit Mississippi Community Education Center, and Favre in September 2022. The message revealed former Mississippi governor Phil Bryant and some members of his government illegally diverted welfare funding to build a volleyball stadium at Favre's alma mater the University of Southern Mississippi, with Favre asking New: "If you were to pay me is there anyway  the media can find out where it came from and how much?"

Bryant became involved in the scheme when he alerted Mississippi State Auditor Shad White about possible fraud inside the Mississippi Department of Human Services.  Text messages between Favre, Bryant, and New also revealed how the departure of John Davis, who himself was found to have been involved in the funds scheme, from the Department of Human Services would be used to divert attention and aid funding for the stadium proposal. Favre's daughter played for the school's volleyball team. In addition, Favre was paid $1.1 million in fees for speeches he never delivered and spent $2 million in fund for a biotech venture he already invested in.

DiBiase family 
Davis was close friends with retired professional wrestlers Ted DiBiase and his two sons, Ted DiBiase Jr. and Brett DiBiase, and encouraged the two nonprofits to compensate them for various services which the office of the Mississippi State Auditor later determined were not performed or did not serve to benefit needy Mississippians. Davis also frequently involved the DiBiases in department affairs and built a public agency motivational speaking program with Ted DiBiase Jr. that was funded by the nonprofits. From 2017 to 2019, DiBiase Jr.'s companies Priceless Ventures LLC and Familiae Orientem were paid over $3 million by the organizations. During Davis' tenure, the Department of Human Services also awarded grants totaling over $2 million to the Heart of David Ministry, a nonprofit owned by Ted DiBiase. The Northeast Mississippi Football Coaches Association was revealed to have received $30,000 in welfare money in early 2019 as a donation "in consideration of ... having Ted DiBiase Jr. as banquet speaker."

Prevacus 
In December 2018, Jake VanLandingham, the owner of a Florida-based pharmaceutical startup company that developed concussion treatments, Prevacus, was introduced to an official at the Mississippi Community Education Center by a Mississippi investor. VanLandingham had several phone calls with nonprofit staff and a meeting before signing an agreement with the organization.

Other 
The Mississippi Community Education Center used TANF funds to provide $5 million towards the construction of a volleyball stadium at University of Southern Mississippi (in the form of a brief lease for one event), paid a mortgage on a ranch in Flora, Mississippi, owned by former football player Marcus Dupree, and funded a fitness program run by former footballer Paul Lacoste. Dupree was also paid by the Mississippi Community Education Center and Family Resource Center of North Mississippi for a statewide lecture tour.

Auditing and criminal investigations 
On June 21, 2019, following the conducting of an internal audit, concerned employees at the Department of Human Services informed Governor Bryant that agency funds may have been misspent. Bryant forwarded the information to State Auditor Shad White, who initiated an investigation. Davis announced his retirement from the directorship the following month. On February 5, 2020, following the delivery of indictments in the Hinds County Circuit Court, special agents from the office of the State Auditor arrested several people whom they accused of embezzling TANF funds: John Davis, Department of Human Services employee Latimer Smith, Brett DiBiase, and Nancy New, Zach New, Anne McGrew, officials of the Mississippi Community Education Center. The defendants initially pleaded not guilty.

Despite the involvement of federal funds, White did not inform any federal authorities about his office's investigation. U.S. Attorney for the United States District Court for the Southern District of Mississippi, Mike Hurst, stated in a press release: "We in the United States Attorney's Office and the FBI only learned ... from media reports about the indictments and arrests, at the same time the general public did." White subsequently shared his office's findings with the Federal Bureau of Investigation and a federal inspector general.

Following the arrests, the Department of Human Services announced it would require stringent documentation from subgrantees and began an internal inquiry to determine if any current agency employees were involved in the impropriety. In early May, White released the Single Audit of the department for the 2019 fiscal year. The auditor's office deemed $94 million of the agency's spending questionable.

Brett DiBiase would plead guilty in December 2020 to making fraudulent statements and paid $5,000 in restitution. As of September 2022, he was still not yet sentenced for his crime.In April 2022, Nancy and Zach New would each eventually plead guilty to multiple charges of bribery of a public official, fraud against the government, and mail fraud. Nancy New would also plead guilty to racketeering.

On September 15, 2022, Davis was indicted in a federal court on charges stemming from the misuse of funds. On September 22, he pled guilty in federal court to one count of conspiracy and one count of theft from a federally-funded program. He then pled guilty in state court to  five counts of conspiracy and 13 counts of defrauding the government. The state court sentenced him to 90 years in prison, with 58 of those years as a suspended sentence.

On March 2, 2023, Brett DiBiase pled guilty to one federal charge of conspiracy to defraud the United States.

Civil proceedings 
In October 2021, the state auditor's office sent demand letters to various recipients of the misspent grant money, asking for repayment. In May 2022, the Department of Human Services filed a lawsuit against 38 defendants to claw back about $24 million in misspent funds. Former federal prosecutor Brad Pigott and the office of the Mississippi Attorney General represented the department. The defendants included Brett Favre, Marcus Dupree, Paul Lacoste, and the DiBiases. On July 22, the director of the Department of Human Services, Bob Anderson, fired Pigott from his position as lead counsel on the state's lawsuit. Pigott alleged the decision was politically motivated. Anderson initially attributed the dismissal to Pigott's failure to inform his superiors about his plans to subpoena documents concerning the volleyball stadium from the University of Southern Mississippi before saying that the state needed a larger legal team. Pigott was replaced the following month by attorneys from the firm Jones Walker.

References 

Crime in Mississippi
Federal assistance in the United States
Political corruption investigations in the United States
Political corruption scandals in the United States